This page lists the songs and artists that have won Söngvakeppnin, the Icelandic preselection for the Eurovision Song Contest. There was no competition held between 1995 and 1999, in 2002, between 2004 and 2005, and in 2021.

List of winners

See also
Söngvakeppnin
Iceland in the Eurovision Song Contest

Iceland in the Eurovision Song Contest
Winners
Lists of award winners